Evangelische Omroep or EO (English: Evangelical Broadcasting) is an Evangelical broadcast television network in Netherlands. It is one of the twelve member-based broadcasting associations contributing to the Netherlands Public Broadcasting system.

History 
EO was founded in 1967 by members of Evangelical churches wanting to put more emphasis on evangelism.  The network also organizes conferences for young people and families.

Television programs 

 De Kist
 Het Familiediner

Controversies 
Documentaries are often edited to reflect EO's creationist convictions. While still being presented as a BBC documentary, The Life of Mammals series was edited to remove material incompatible with young earth creationism, and profanity is regularly edited out of bought-in drama series.

Creationism 
The subject of creationism has sparked a number of EO-related controversies. In early 2009, a controversy arose over statements by a leading presenter and former director, Andries Knevel. He considered it possible for a religious person not to believe in the literal interpretation of the biblical creation story (Genesis 1-2). Shortly afterwards Knevel apologized for the highly charged way in which he had made his statements and for the fact that his personal viewpoint could have been interpreted as the official viewpoint of EO.

Arie Boomsma 
In 2009 Arie Boomsma, an EO television presenter was suspended for three months after appearing partially undressed in a magazine called L'Homo. Later that year, EO planned to broadcast a new television show called Loopt een man over het water... ("A man walks over the water...") which Boomsma would present. In the show, non-Christian comedians were to be asked to create short sketches about Jesus of Nazareth. The planned show caused so much uproar among EO members that it was cancelled. Soon afterwards Boomsma left EO and joined the Catholic broadcasting association KRO.

Decline in membership 
As a result of these and other controversies, the number of subscribing EO members has declined. In March 2010, this led to a member initiative entitled Ik bid en blijf lid (I pray and stay a member) which called upon members of EO to retain their membership and pray that the association will continue to spread God's word in a way that remains true to the Bible.

References

External links 
 Official site 

Dutch public broadcasting organisations
Netherlands Public Broadcasting
Christian organizations established in 1967
Evangelical organizations established in the 20th century
Dutch-language television networks
Evangelical television networks
Television channels and stations established in 1967